Sawssen Ismail is a Tunisian footballer who plays for ASF Sahel and the Tunisia women's national team.

Club career
Ismail has played for Sahel in Tunisia.

International career
Ismail has capped for Tunisia at senior level, including a 0–4 friendly loss to Algeria on 23 June 2009.

See also
List of Tunisia women's international footballers

References

External links

Year of birth missing (living people)
Living people
Tunisian women's footballers
Tunisia women's international footballers
Women's association footballers not categorized by position